The Rack Pack is a 2016 British comedy-drama television film about professional snooker during the 1970s through the 1980s, focusing on the intense rivalry between Alex Higgins and Steve Davis. The film is directed by Brian Welsh and was released on BBC iPlayer on 17 January 2016.

Cast

Luke Treadaway as Alex Higgins
Will Merrick as Steve Davis
Kevin Bishop as Barry Hearn
Nichola Burley as Lynn Higgins
James Bailey as Jimmy White
Daniel Fearn as Robbo
John Sessions as Ted Lowe
Tom Fisher as Pete
Rob Crouch as Oliver Reed
Russ Bain as Cliff Thorburn
Marc McCardie as Tony Knowles
Caolan Byrne as Dennis Taylor
Gary Davis as Bill Werbeniuk
Jimmy Watkins as Terry Griffiths
Konstantine Osipenkov as Willie Thorne

Release
BBC released The Rack Pack in January 2016 as an exclusive on its media service iPlayer to be available for 12 months. The Guardians Mark Lawson said while this was not the first exclusive on BBC's service, "It clearly feels the most ambitious, and the one that might otherwise have been expected to be conventionally screened." The film ranked in the top twenty requested programmes on iplayer for January and racked up over a million requests in its first three months of release. It had its television premiere on BBC Two later in the year.

Reception
Rachel Ward of The Daily Telegraph said of the film's comedy, "The humour was gentle, coming from a wry recognition of the era's excesses." She said, "The film expertly gave depth to the character of Davis, with Merrick managing to convey a controlled stillness, as the future six-time world champion grew from nerdy teenager to confident ace."

References

External links

The Rack Pack at BBC

2016 television films
2016 films
2010s sports comedy-drama films
British sports comedy-drama films
Films set in the 1980s
Snooker films
2016 drama films
2010s English-language films
2010s British films
British comedy-drama television films